In enzymology, a D-malate dehydrogenase (decarboxylating) is an enzyme that catalyzes the chemical reaction

(R)-malate + NAD+  pyruvate + CO2 + NADH

Thus, the two substrates of this enzyme are (R)-malate and NAD+, whereas its 3 products are pyruvate, CO2, and NADH.

This enzyme belongs to the family of oxidoreductases, specifically those acting on the CH-OH group of a donor with NAD+ or NADP+ as acceptor. The systematic name of this enzyme class is (R)-malate:NAD+ oxidoreductase (decarboxylating). Other names in common use include D-malate dehydrogenase, D-malic enzyme, bifunctional L(+)-tartrate dehydrogenase-D(+)-malate (decarboxylating). This enzyme participates in butanoate metabolism.

References

 

EC 1.1.1
NADH-dependent enzymes
Enzymes of known structure